The Rt. Rev. William Bedell, D.D. (15717 February 1642), was an Anglican churchman who served as Lord Bishop of Kilmore, as well as Provost of Trinity College Dublin.

Early life
He was born at Black Notley in Essex, and educated at Emmanuel College, Cambridge, where he was a pupil of William Perkins. He became a fellow of Emmanuel in 1593, and took orders. In 1607 he was appointed chaplain to Sir Henry Wotton, then English ambassador at Venice, where he remained for four years, acquiring a great reputation as a scholar and theologian.

He translated the Book of Common Prayer into Italian, and was on terms of close friendship with the reformer, Paolo Sarpi. He wrote a series of sermons with Fulgenzio Micanzio, Sarpi's disciple. In 1616 he was appointed to the rectory of Horningsheath (near Bury St Edmunds, where he had previously worked), which he held for twelve years.

Ireland
In 1627, he became Provost of Trinity College Dublin, despite having no prior connection with Ireland. The Provostship paid roughly the same as his Horningsheath rectory and he clung to his living in Suffolk until forced to surrender it on grounds of benefice. Despite his evangelical Protestant wish to advance Irish Reformation, Bedell decreed a chapter of the Irish New Testament to be read at dinner by a native Irish speaker and Irish prayers in the chapel.

In 1629, he was appointed to become Bishop of Kilmore and Ardagh. He set himself to reform the abuses of his diocese, encouraged the use of the Irish language, and personally undertook the duties generally discharged by the bishop's lay chancellor. He is noted for commissioning the translation of the Bible into the Irish Language, which translation was undertaken by the Protestant Rector of Templeport parish, The Rev. Muircheartach Ó Cionga. He would appoint only Irish speakers to parishes.

In 1633, he resigned the see of Ardagh, retaining the more primitive bishopric of Kilmore, where he had encountered some opposition from Anglicans and Catholics alike for his undertaking of reaching out to the Irish. He was determined to rebuild the neglected church buildings throughout the diocese, where, in 1638, he held a synod of all the Anglican priests and officers within the diocese to discuss lax discipline. He was asked by the court of the Plantation Commission to "lay out" the town of Virginia, County Cavan after complaints from the residents there about the landlords' failure to build the town and provide a church for worship.

Bedell was a man of simple life, often walking miles on foot or on horse, travelling the dangerous byways. Bedell provided assistance to converts to Protestantism enabling them to study for the ministry.

Bedell sided with the Catholics of Kilmore against the excess of Alan Cooke, the incumbent chancellor of the diocese. However, the church courts found that Cooke had legally acquired the right as chancellor, and the Bishop was unable to remove him.

With the outbreak of the Irish Rebellion of 1641, the local warlords, led by the O'Reillys, took control of the area. The O'Reillys "gave comfortable words to the Bishop" and Bedell's house at Kilmore in County Cavan was left untouched, becoming a place of refuge for those seeking shelter from the rebel insurgents. In the end, however, the rebels insisted upon the dismissal of all who had taken shelter in his house, and on the bishop's refusal he was seized and imprisoned with some others to the nearby island castle of Lough Oughter, Cloughoughter Castle.

Here, he was detained for several weeks and was released only after signing a deposition and a remonstrance from his captors, "pleading on their behalf for graces from King Charles." Bedell was now into the care of his friend Denis Sheridan but the imprisonment and torture had worked their damage. Shortly after his release Bedell died from his wounds and exposure on 7 February 1642.

Bishop Bedell was afforded the dignity by his captors of being buried next to his wife Leah at Kilmore, where he received an honourable funeral in the presence of his O'Reilly captors.

The story of his life was written by Bishop Gilbert Burnet in 1685 and by his elder son (ed. T. W. Jones, for the Camden Society, 1872). Bedell's Last Will and Testament is available through the UK National Archives.

Bibliography
A true relation of the life and death of the Right Reverend father in God William Bedell, Lord Bishop of Kilmore in Ireland. Edited by Thomas Wharton Jones. Camden Society, 1872 (online version)
Trasna na dTonnta or A Tale of Three Cities fictionalised biography by Christina Eastwood (Mothers' Companion Publications, 2017)
Stefano Villani, Making Italy Anglican: Why the Book of Common Prayer Was Translated into Italian (New York: Oxford University Press, 2022)

Notes

References

External links
Descendant Chart

1571 births
1642 deaths
Anglican bishops of Kilmore
Bishops of Kilmore and Ardagh
Doctors of Divinity
Fellows of Emmanuel College, Cambridge
People from Black Notley
Provosts of Trinity College Dublin
16th-century English clergy
16th-century English translators
17th-century English Anglican priests
17th-century English translators
Translators of the Bible into Irish